Reagon is a surname. People with that name include:
 Bernice Johnson Reagon (born 1942), American singer, composer, scholar, and social activist, founder of the a cappella ensemble Sweet Honey in the Rock
 Cordell Reagon (194396), American singer and activist
 Toshi Reagon (born 1964), American folk/blues musician, daughter of Bernice and Cordell

See also 
 Reagan (disambiguation)
 Ronald Reagan (19112004), 40th president of the U.S.A.